Mohsen Safaei Farahani is an Iranian reformist politician.

Career
He is a member of Mosharekat Party, the main reformist party in Iran under President Khatami. He was a Majlis representative from Tehran from 1999 to 2003. He was also the President of the Iranian Football Federation from 1998 to 2002.

IFF Transitory Board
In November 2006 the federation was suspended by FIFA due to government interference in football matters. In less than a month the ban was lifted and a new Transitory Board was composed of Farahani as chairman, Kiomars Hashemi as deputy chairman and Mohammad Hassan Ansarifar, Dr Hassan Ghafiri, Dr Mohammad Khabiri and Ali Reghbati as members.

The Transitory Board came to an end on January 9, 2008, when Ali Kaffashian was elected as the new president of the Iran Football Federation.

Arrest
Mohsen Safaei Farahani has been himself arrested in June 2009 during the aftermath of the 2009 presidential elections and subsequent protests. Safai Farahani, who has been detained since June 20, was accused of "acting against national security, propaganda against the system, insulting officials and spreading lies "lawyer Hooshang Pour-Babai told the state broadcaster".

Safaei Farahani had been sentenced to six years in jail for the first two charges and acquitted of insulting officials and spreading lies for lack of evidence, adding there would be an appeal.

References

Iranian reformists
Deputies of Tehran, Rey, Shemiranat and Eslamshahr
Association football executives
Presidents of Iranian Football Federation
Living people
Islamic Iran Participation Front politicians
Iranian prisoners and detainees
Members of the 6th Islamic Consultative Assembly
1948 births